KVEW (channel 42) is a television station licensed to Kennewick, Washington, United States, serving as the ABC affiliate for the Tri-Cities area. Owned by Morgan Murphy Media, the station has studios on North Edison Street in Kennewick, and its transmitter is located on Jump Off Joe Butte.

Although identifying as a station in its own right, KVEW is considered a semi-satellite of KAPP (channel 35) in Yakima. As such, it simulcasts all network and syndicated programming as provided through its parent, and the two stations share a website. However, KVEW airs separate commercial inserts and legal identifications. Local newscasts are simulcast on both stations. KVEW serves the eastern half of the Yakima/Tri-Cities market while KAPP serves the western portion. The two stations are counted as a single unit for ratings purposes. Master control and some internal operations are based at the studios of sister station and fellow ABC affiliate KXLY-TV on West Boone Avenue in Spokane.

On satellite, KVEW is only available on Dish Network, while DirecTV carries KAPP instead. Both providers do not carry either station's MeTV subchannel.

History

The station began serving the Tri-Cities region in October 1970, a month after sister station KAPP signed on. Before KVEW's existence, KEPR-TV (channel 19) had carried ABC as a secondary affiliation until 1959; KNBS-TV (channel 22) operated briefly in nearby Walla Walla, Washington as an ABC affiliate in 1960; KNDU (channel 25) signed on in 1961 and became the area's primary ABC affiliate until 1965, when it switched its primary affiliation to NBC. Both KEPR-TV and KNDU shared ABC programming from that point until KVEW signed on and all ABC programming moved to KVEW.

The station began airing Spokane's MeTV affiliate KXMN-LD on a digital subchannel in September 2006. KVEW was one of the remaining stations to sign-off every night, but that practice ended in 2012 when World News Now was added to the programming lineup.

On December 22, 2008, KVEW discontinued its 6 p.m. and weekend newscasts. The 11 p.m. newscast was reduced to a five-minute broadcast before Nightline, and after January 2013, Jimmy Kimmel Live! In addition to this move, 17 employees from KVEW and KAPP were laid off.

With the cancellation of The Insider and Extra moving from 6 p.m. to 7:30 on September 11, 2017, KVEW began airing local news at 6:00, for the first time in almost a decade.

Technical information

Subchannels
The station's digital signal is multiplexed:

Translators

References

External links
KVEW ABC 42

ABC network affiliates
Morgan Murphy Media stations
MeTV affiliates
Heroes & Icons affiliates
Start TV affiliates
Dabl affiliates
Television channels and stations established in 1970
1970 establishments in Washington (state)
VEW